Saint Rusticus (French: Saint-Rustique) may refer to:

Saint Rusticus of Clermont (died 446), Bishop of Clermont in Auvergne
Saint Rusticus (Archbishop of Lyon)
Saint Rusticus of Narbonne, bishop of that city
 a martyred companion of Saint Denis of Paris
 A martyr of Verona; see Saints Firmus and Rusticus

See also
Saint-Rustice, Haute-Garonne, France